Ghazi Ayadi (born 19 July 1996) is a Tunisian footballer who plays as a midfielder for Saudi Arabian club Al-Kawkab.

Club career
He began his career with Club Africain. On 6 March 2020, he signed for Saudi club Damac.

On 26 December 2022, Ayadi joined Al-Kawkab.

International career
He made his international debut for Tunisia in 2018.

References

External links

1996 births
Living people
Tunisian footballers
Tunisian expatriate footballers
Tunisia international footballers
Club Africain players
Damac FC players
Al-Ittihad Club (Tripoli) players
Al-Kawkab FC players
Tunisian Ligue Professionnelle 1 players
Saudi Professional League players
Saudi Second Division players
Association football midfielders
Expatriate footballers in Saudi Arabia
Expatriate footballers in Libya
Tunisian expatriate sportspeople in Saudi Arabia
Tunisian expatriate sportspeople in Libya